The Department of the Air Force Office of Special Investigations (OSI) is a U.S. federal law enforcement agency that reports directly to the Secretary of the Air Force. OSI is also a U.S. Air Force field operating agency under the administrative guidance and oversight of the Inspector General of the Department of the Air Force. By federal statute, OSI provides independent criminal investigative, counterintelligence and protective service operations worldwide and outside of the traditional military chain of command. Proactively, OSI identifies, investigates, and neutralizes serious criminal, terrorist, and espionage threats to personnel and resources of the Air Force, Space Force, and the U.S. Department of Defense, thereby protecting the national security of the United States.

Overview
The Office of Special Investigations capabilities:
 Protect critical technologies and information
 Detect and mitigate threats 
 Provide global specialized services
 Conduct major criminal investigations 
 Engage foreign adversaries and threats offensively

OSI's Cornerstone is to vigorously solve crime, protect secrets, warn of threats, exploit intelligence opportunities, and operate in cyber. OSI investigates a wide variety of serious offenses – espionage, terrorism, crimes against property, violence against people, larceny, computer hacking, acquisition fraud, drug use and distribution, financial misdeeds, military desertion, corruption of the contracting process, and any other illegal activity that undermines the mission of the Air Force, Space Force, or the DoD.

As of 2007, OSI had 2,900 employees. After pilot training, OSI remains the second-most requested career choice in the Air Force for officers.

History
The Office of Special Investigations was founded in 1948 at the suggestion of Congress to consolidate investigative activities in the Air Force. Secretary of the Air Force W. Stuart Symington created OSI as a Field Operating Agency and patterned it after the Federal Bureau of Investigation (FBI). He appointed Special Agent Joseph Francis Carroll, a senior FBI official and assistant to FBI Director J. Edgar Hoover, as the first Commander of OSI and charged him with providing independent, unbiased and centrally directed investigations of criminal activity in the Air Force.  Carroll later became the first Director of the Defense Intelligence Agency

The Office of Special Investigations was officially established by Chief of Staff of the United States Air Force Carl Spaatz General Order №1 of 2 January 1948. This same Order had appointed Joseph Francis Carroll as OSI commander. The official letter of Carl Spaatz of 9 April 1948 set forth the functions and responsibilities of the Office of Special Investigations, which were "to provide a competent, centrally directed special investigations service to all Air Force activities", including the investigation of such major offenses as "fraud and/or conspiracy, arson, black-market operations, bribery, burglary, embezzlement, forgery, larceny, perjury, robbery, smuggling, and similar offenses ... and other major violations of the Articles of War, Federal Statute, and/or other pertinent directives".

A new Chief of Staff of the United States Air Force Hoyt Vandenberg signed the General Order №29 of 15 July 1948 that empowered the Office of Special Investigations to carry out the counterintelligence activity including the detection of espionage, sabotage, treason, sedition, subversion, disloyalty, and disaffection. Also it was specifically stated that OSI would be responsible for all investigations formerly performed by the USAF Counterintelligence Corps.

1 August 1948 is considered the operational date of the Office of Special Investigations.

Organization
In addition to the OSI headquarters at Quantico, VA, OSI has seven field investigations regions aligned with Air Force major commands and the Unified combatant commands

 Region 1 with Air Force Materiel Command, Air Force Special Operations Command, Air Force Reserve Command
 Region 2 with Air Combat Command, United States Central Command, United States Southern Command, United States Strategic Command, 12th Air Force, 16th Air Force
 Region 3 with Air Mobility Command, United States Transportation Command, United States Special Operations Command, United States Central Command, Air Force District of Washington, Pentagon Force Protection Agency
 Region 4 with Air Education and Training Command, 2nd Air Force, 19th Air Force, Air University
 Region 5 with United States Air Forces in Europe – Air Forces Africa, United States Africa Command, United States European Command, 3rd Air Force
 Region 6 with Pacific Air Forces, United States Indo-Pacific Command, Special Operations Command Pacific, 5th Air Force, 7th Air Force, 11th Air Force
 Region 8 with United States Space Force, Air Force Global Strike Command, United States Northern Command, 8th Air Force, 14th Air Force, 20th Air Force, United States Air Force Academy

In addition, OSI has several specialized investigative, training, or supporting units:

Office of Special Projects (PJ)
Office of Procurement Fraud (PF)
Force Support Squadron (FSS)
U.S. Air Force Special Investigations Academy (USAFSIA)
Investigations, Collections, Operations Nexus (ICON) Center

OSI is the designated executive agency for the Department of Defense Cyber Crime Center.

While the regions serve the investigative needs of those aligned major commands, all OSI units and personnel remain independent of those commands. In the OSI chains of command each region is directly under the OSI headquarters. Such organizational independence is intended to ensure unbiased investigations.

At the regional level are subordinate units called field investigations squadrons, detachments, and operating locations. There are more than 255 OSI units worldwide including, Jordan, Saudi Arabia, Yemen, Iraq, Afghanistan and other Middle East locations.

Operations

Threat detection

OSI manages offensive and defensive activities to detect, counter and destroy the effectiveness of hostile intelligence services and terrorist groups that target the Air Force and Space Force. These efforts include investigating the crimes of espionage, terrorism, technology transfer and computer infiltration. This mission aspect also includes providing personal protection to senior Air Force and Space Force leaders and other officials, as well as supervising an extensive antiterrorism program in geographic areas of heightened terrorist activity.

Criminal investigations

The vast majority of OSI's investigative activities pertain to felony crimes including murder, robbery, rape, assault, major burglaries, drug use and trafficking, sex offenses, arson, black market activities, and other serious criminal activities. In January 2014, while investigating synthetic drugs abuse, OSI uncovered the facts of cheating on monthly proficiency exams at the 341st Missile Wing at Malmstrom Air Force Base in Montana involving 79 officers.

Economic crime investigations

A significant amount of OSI investigative resources are assigned to fraud (or economic crime) investigations. These include violations of the public trust involving Air Force and Space Force contracting matters, appropriated and nonappropriated funds activities, computer systems, pay and allowance matters, environmental matters, acquiring and disposing of Air Force and Space Force property, and major administrative irregularities. OSI uses fraud surveys to determine the existence, location and extent of fraud in Air Force and Space Force operations or programs. It also provides briefings to base and command-level resource managers to help identify and prevent fraud involving Air Force, Space Force, or Department of Defense (DoD) resources.

Information operations

The Air Force and Space Force is now countering a global security threat to information systems. OSI's role in support of Information Operations recognizes future threats to the Air Force and Space Force, and its response to these threats will occur in cyberspace. OSI's support to information operations comes in many forms. OSI's computer crime investigators provide rapid worldwide response to intrusions into Air Force and Space Force systems.

Technology protection

The desires of potential adversaries to acquire or mimic the technological advances of the Air Force and Space Force have heightened the need to protect critical Air Force and Space Force technologies and collateral data. The OSI Research and Technology Protection Program provides focused, comprehensive counterintelligence and core mission investigative services to safeguard Air Force and Space Force technologies, programs, critical program information, personnel and facilities.

Specialized services

OSI has numerous specialists who are invaluable in the successful resolution of investigations. They include technical specialists, polygraphers, behavioral scientists, computer experts and forensic advisers.

Department of Defense Cyber Crime Center

The Department of Defense Cyber Crime Center (DC3) was established as an organic entity within OSI in 1998. The formation of the DC3 expanded the operational scope of the OSI Computer Forensic Lab, established in 1995 as the first of its kind within the DoD. DC3 provides digital and multimedia forensics, cyber investigative training, research, development, test and evaluation, and cyber analytics for the following DoD mission areas:  information assurance and critical infrastructure protection, law enforcement and counterintelligence, document and media exploitation, and counterterrorism. DC3 is a national cyber center and serves as the operational focal point for the Defense Industrial Base Cybersecurity and Information Assurance Program (DIB CS/IA Program).

Training and physical requirements
All new OSI special agent recruits—whether officer, enlisted, or civilian—receive their entry-level training at the U.S. Department of Homeland Security’s Federal Law Enforcement Training Center (FLETC) in Glynco, Georgia. The training requires that each recruit meet various physical requirements. The candidates attend the 12-week Criminal Investigator Training Program with other federal law enforcement trainees. That course is followed by eight weeks of OSI agency-specific coursework, at the U.S. Air Force Special Investigations Academy (USAFSIA), co-located at FLETC. Both courses offer new agents training in firearms and other weapons, defensive tactics, forensics, surveillance and surveillance detection, antiterrorism techniques, crime scene processing, interrogations and interviews, court testimony, and military and federal law. Upon graduation, new OSI special agents spend a one-year probationary period in the field. Upon successful completion, some agents receive specialized training in economic crime, antiterrorism service, counterintelligence, computer crimes and other sophisticated criminal investigative capabilities. Others attend 12 weeks of technical training to acquire electronic, photographic and other skills required to perform technical surveillance countermeasures. Experienced agents selected for polygraph duties attend a 14-week Department of Defense course.

Each recruit is expected to participate in each of the following exercises: flexibility, bench press,  run/walk and agility run. All students are tested to determine their fitness level, and each test is age and gender normed. OSI special agents are expected to remain physically fit throughout their employment and must maintain Air Force physical fitness standards as defined by Air Force Instruction (AFI) 36-2905.

Firearms

OSI agents' primary firearm is the 9×19mm SIG Sauer P228, though other weapons are available for use depending on the needs of the mission, including the M4 and MP5.  Agents may also carry a personally owned weapon (POW) from an approved list of manufacturers in 9mm. However, agents must qualify with the government-issued SIG Sauer P228.

Air Force Academy Informant Program

In December 2013, The Colorado Springs Gazette reported that OSI was operating a Confidential Informant Program at the U.S. Air Force Academy (USAFA), Colorado Springs, CO, which recruited cadets to gather information about other rule breakers and criminals. The program left the recruits to take responsibility for both the initial incident that got them into trouble and any subsequent rule-breaking behavior resulting from the directions of OSI agents. One of the cadets who participated said, "...it was effective. We got 15 convictions of drugs, two convictions of sexual assault. We were making a difference. It was motivating, especially with the sexual assaults. You could see the victims have a sense of peace."

In response, the USAFA Superintendent will now have oversight of the program at the Academy. Though the Superintendent will be aware of the operations, OSI will still have command and control of the program.

Failure to report information to the FBI

In 2017, former Airman Devin Kelley shot and killed 26 people and wounded 22 others at the First Baptist Church of Sutherland Springs, TX. According to media and a Department of Defense Inspector General report, Kelly was convicted of assault and discharged from the Air Force. This information was supposed to be reported by OSI to the FBI's Criminal Justice Information Services Division. Had this occurred, Kelley would have been unable to purchase a firearm legally through a Federal Firearms License (FFL). OSI failed to send the data four times. According to the SECAF, "the failure in reporting Kelley's criminal history was not an isolated event unique to this case or to Holloman AFB, NM, where the investigation unfolded."

In popular culture

 
 In the 2008 film Eagle Eye, actress Rosario Dawson played OSI Special Agent Zoe Perez.
In the 2013 film Mirage Men, Richard Doty, a retired OSI special agent, played himself in a documentary about the OSI investigation into UFOs between 1952 and 1969.
In the seventh episode of Season 8 in the 1997 television series Stargate SG-1, SG-1 team member Teal'c has been given permission to live off-base by the OSI in general, but is subsequently investigated by OSI officer 'Colonel Kendrick' for stopping or otherwise becoming involved with crimes in his neighbourhood.
In the first episode of Season 2 in the 2013 television series The Americans, KGB Agents Phillip Jennings (Matthew Rhys) and Emmett Connors posed as "Air Force Security" and wore OSI badges.

See also

 List of Commanders of the Air Force Office of Special Investigations
 List of United States federal law enforcement agencies

Military Criminal Investigative Organizations
United States Army Criminal Investigation Command (USACIDC or CID)
United States Army Counterintelligence (ACI)
Naval Criminal Investigative Service (NCIS)
Defense Criminal Investigative Service (DCIS)
Coast Guard Investigative Service (CGIS)

Department of the Air Force
Secretary of the Air Force
Inspector General of the Department of the Air Force
Judge Advocate General's Corps, U.S. Air Force
United States Air Force Security Forces
Department of the Air Force Police
U.S. Air Force Intelligence, Surveillance and Reconnaissance Agency
6004th Air Intelligence Service Squadron

Other
Special Agent
Federal Law Enforcement Training Centers
Department of Defense Cyber Crime Center (DC3)
Criminal Investigation Task Force (CITF)
Internet Crimes Against Children (ICAC) Task Force
Arlen Specter, former U.S. Senator for Pennsylvania and OSI special agent
Herbert H. Bateman, former member of the U.S. House of Representatives for Virginia's 1st congressional district and OSI special agent
Donald Nichols, former OSI special agent

References

External links

 

 
1948 establishments in the United States
Military units and formations established in 1948
Military units and formations in Virginia
United States Air Force specialisms
Military police agencies of the United States
Air force police agencies
Specialist law enforcement agencies of the United States
Federal law enforcement agencies of the United States
United States intelligence agencies
Counterintelligence agencies
Crime prevention
Cybercrime
Computer security organizations